Velotte is a little area of Besançon, with 2000 inhabitants.

History 
Velotte was a little village before being attached to Besançon.

Monuments 
 Church 
 Fountain

Administrative buildings 
 Stadium

Transports 
 Bus, number 24

Areas of Besançon